Risto Ankio (born 15 April 1937) is a Finnish athlete. He competed in the men's pole vault at the 1964 Summer Olympics.

References

External links
 

1937 births
Living people
Athletes (track and field) at the 1964 Summer Olympics
Finnish male pole vaulters
Olympic athletes of Finland